Two ships of the Royal Navy have borne the name HMS Garth.

  was a  launched in 1917 and sold in 1923. 
  was a  launched in 1940 and scrapped in 1958.

Royal Navy ship names